Juan Martín del Potro was the defending champion, but chose not to compete.

John Isner won in the final, 6–3, 5–7, 7–6(7–2), against Arnaud Clément.

Seeds
The top four seeds receive a bye to the second round.

Draw

Finals

Top half

Bottom half

Qualifying
All seeded players received a bye into the second round, and all players playing in the fourth qualifier received a bye into the second round.

Seeds

Qualifiers

Draw

First qualifier

Second qualifier

Third qualifier

Fourth qualifier

External links
 Main Draw
 Qualifying Draw

Heineken Open - Singles
2010 Heineken Open